Dorothea Mierisch (1885–1977) was an American artist born in New York City in 1885, and she died in Hopewell, New Jersey in 1977.

In 1936, Mierisch participated in the annual exhibition held at the Art Institute of Chicago and presented a painting titled Abandoned Quarry. In 1939, she painted a mural at the post office of Bamberg, South Carolina, depicting the map of the cotton trade route. The U. S. Treasury Department's Section of Painting and Sculpture commissioned the work.

In 1941, she painted another mural, "The First Official Airmail Flight", at the McLeansboro, Illinois, post office, celebrating a flight that took place in the town on September 26, 1912. A study of this mural is held by the Smithsonian American Art Museum. The National Gallery of Art in Washington D.C. owns five of her drawings depicting clothes.

References 

1885 births
1977 deaths
20th-century American painters
American muralists
American women painters
Painters from New York City
Artists from New Jersey
20th-century American women
Section of Painting and Sculpture artists